Chappes may refer to the following places in France:

 Chappes, Allier, a commune in the department of Allier
 Chappes, Ardennes, a commune in the department of Ardennes
 Chappes, Aube, a commune in the department of Aube
 Chappes, Puy-de-Dôme, a commune in the department of Puy-de-Dôme

See also

 Chappe (disambiguation)
 Chaps